Yashiga (Mandarin: 牙什尕镇) is a town in Hualong Hui Autonomous County, Haidong, Qinghai, China. In 2010, Yashiga had a total population of 13,580 people: 6,576 males and 7,004 females: 3,967 under 14 years old, 8,765 aged between 15 and 64 and 848 over 65 years old.

References 

Towns in China
Township-level divisions of Qinghai
Haidong